Alfred Poupart (5 June 1876- February 1963) was a French archer.  He competed at the 1908 Summer Olympics in London. Poupart entered the men's double York round event in 1908.  He was the only archer of the 27-man field to not finish, withdrawing partway through the first round with only 36 points.  He then competed in the Continental style contest, placing 16th at 155 points.

References

 
 

Archers at the 1908 Summer Olympics
Olympic archers of France
French male archers
1876 births
1963 deaths
20th-century French people